Peter Franklin Hansen (December 5, 1921 – April 9, 2017) was an American actor, best known for his role as lawyer Lee Baldwin, on the soap opera General Hospital, appearing in the role from 1963 to 1986, briefly in 1989 and 1990, and returning to the role from 1992 to 2004. In 1989, he appeared in the movie The War of the Roses.

Early life
Hansen was born on December 5, 1921, in Oakland, California to Sydney Henry Hansen (1897-1971) and Lena Gertrude Young (1896-1983). His family moved to Detroit, Michigan where his parents divorced. His mother remarried Falconer O'Brien, and had a daughter named Charlotte O'Brien, who died in 1934 at the age of five. Hansen served in World War II in the United States Marine Corps and flew combat in the South Pacific. He flew F4U Corsairs and participated in the invasion of Peleliu in September 1944. In 1950, after he left the Marines, Hansen signed a contract with Paramount Pictures and became an actor.

Career
Hansen appeared in more than 100 films, television series and made-for-television movies. His early acting roles were at the famed Pasadena Playhouse. Hansen was a guest star on Reed Hadley's CBS crime drama, The Public Defender, and the television adaptation of Gertrude Berg's comedy The Goldbergs. In addition to his work on General Hospital, he notably co-starred in 1963 on the NBC soap opera Ben Jerrod. He also appeared on The Golden Girls in 1985 (Season 1, Episode 5) as Dr. Elliott Clayton, a casanova who makes a pass at Blanche while dating Dorothy. In 1988, he starred in an episode of Cheers ("And God Created Woodman"; Season 6, Episode 14), as Daniel T. Collier, the CEO and chairman of the board of Lillian, the company which owns Cheers. Other notable appearances include work on Broken Arrow, Richard Diamond, Private Detective, Maverick, Sea Hunt, Petticoat Junction, Gomer Pyle, U.S.M.C., How The West Was Won, The Adventures of Jim Bowie, Magnum, P.I., L.A. Law, Night Court, and Growing Pains.

Hansen had a major role in the 1950 Western film Branded with Alan Ladd, the 1951 science fiction film When Worlds Collide, and the 1952 Western film The Savage with Charlton Heston. In the 1960s, He made commercials for Chrysler products, mostly Plymouths, on shows hosted by Lawrence Welk, Steve Allen, and Garry Moore. In 1961, Hansen was a news anchor at the Los Angeles based TV station KCOP-TV.

In 1997, Hansen began playing the character on the sister show Port Charles. The early years of Port Charles saw the Baldwins as the core family, focusing on Lee's son, Scotty, and granddaughter, Karen. After their storyline took them back to "GH", Peter made occasional appearances on both shows, last appearing in 2004. Although he retired from acting afterwards, he did appear at the off-screen 50th Anniversary party in 2013 along with former on-screen wife Susan Brown.

Personal life and death
Hansen met his future wife, Florence Elizabeth "Betty" Moe, while in high school and married her in 1943. Together, they had three children, Kristen, Peter and Gretchen, had three grandchildren: Allison, Erik and Jamal. Betty died in 1993 and his daughter, Kris, died in 1996. He then shared 24 years as companion to Barbara Wenzel.

Hansen resided in Tarzana, California, with his family, and he enjoyed flying, owning his own Cessna for decades, spent many vacations in the Sierra Nevada high country. He led a devoted spiritual life at St. Nicholas of Myra Episcopal Church, in Encino, California. Hansen died on April 9, 2017, at his home in Tarzana, California, at the age of 95. He was cremated via Peaceful Reflections Cremation Care in Santa Clarita, and his ashes were returned to the family.

Awards
Hansen won a Daytime Emmy Award for his portrayal of Lee Baldwin on General Hospital in 1979 in the category of Outstanding Supporting Actor in a Drama Series.

Filmography

Film

Television

References

Notes

  Credited as Peter Hanson.
  Uncredited role.
  Credited as Peter Nason.

Citations

Sources

External links 
 

1921 births
2017 deaths
American male soap opera actors
Daytime Emmy Award winners
Daytime Emmy Award for Outstanding Supporting Actor in a Drama Series winners
Male actors from Oakland, California
Male actors from Los Angeles
United States Marine Corps pilots of World War II
University of Michigan alumni
20th-century American Episcopalians
People from Detroit